The Day of the Beast may refer to:

 The Day of the Beast (film), 1995 Spanish film
 The Day of the Beast (book), 1922 novel by Zane Grey
 Frankenstein: Day of the Beast, 2011 horror film